Lorne McKean (born 1939) is an English sculptor. She studied at the Guildford School of Art and the Royal Academy School, before being elected as a Fellow of the Royal Society of British Sculptors in 1972. McKean's husband was Edwin Russell (died 2013), a fellow sculptor.

Selected public artworks

References

Living people
1939 births
20th-century British sculptors
20th-century English women artists
21st-century British sculptors
21st-century English women artists
Alumni of the Royal Academy Schools
English women sculptors
Modern sculptors